Vorn is a surname. Notable people with the surname include:

 Bill Vorn (born 1959), Canadian artist, musician, and professor
 Vorn Vet (1929–1978), Cambodian politician

See also
 Corn (surname)
 Vonn
 Voorn